Spencer Moritz Gallagher (born November 20, 1989) is an American professional stock car racing driver. He last competed part-time in the NASCAR Monster Energy Cup Series, driving the No. 23 Toyota Camry for BK Racing, part-time in the NASCAR Xfinity Series, driving the No. 23 Chevrolet Camaro, and part-time the NASCAR Camping World Truck Series, driving the No. 2 Chevrolet Silverado for GMS Racing. He is the son of Allegiant Air's CEO, Maurice J. Gallagher Jr. In 2018, Gallagher announced that he would step away from full-time racing at the end of the 2018 season to take on a managerial role at GMS Racing.

Early career
Gallagher was born in Las Vegas, Nevada. According to Gallagher, he and fellow driver Dylan Kwasniewski lived in the same neighborhood growing up, though their first encounter was on the racetrack. He is the son of Allegiant Air CEO Maury Gallagher. Gallagher spent time working for a Silicon Valley software company at age 19 while transitioning to a full-time racing career.

Gallagher began racing at age 12 in the Bandolero Bandit Series, then progressing to the Legends Car Series at the Las Vegas Motor Speedway Bullring. Gallagher began to take his racing prospects seriously in 2009 on the recommendation of car owner and former driver T.J. Clark. He won the Silver State Road Racing Championship that year, and the INEX Legends Road Course World Finals in 2010. He also ran 6 races in the Super Late Model Series with a best finish of fourth. In 2011, Gallagher made 6 starts in the NASCAR K&N Pro Series West, then made two in the East Series in both 2011 and 2012.

Developmental series

2011–2013

Gallagher made his debut in the ARCA Racing Series at Indianapolis Raceway Park in 2011, and ran two more races with a best finish of 15th in the No. 05 Allegiant Air Chevrolet. He ran the full 19-race schedule in 2012, earning six top 10s and finishing 7th in points. His results improved in 2013, with 12 laps led, five top-five finishes and eight top-ten finishes. He failed to qualify for two races, however, and missed a race after a concussion at Michigan, relegating him to a 10th-place points finish. Gallagher also attempted five races, failing to qualify for two, in the Camping World Truck Series, with a best finish of 20th at Texas.

2014
Gallagher ran the full ARCA schedule in 2014, along with a partial schedule in the No. 23 in the Truck Series, sharing the ride with Max Gresham.

Gallagher was involved in an incident with John Wes Townley at the Iowa truck race in July, leading to a physical confrontation between the two and their respective crew members after the race. Townley and Gallagher, both competitors in the ARCA series as well, felt there was mutual bad blood built up between each other. The two had a friendlier conversation afterwards.

In October 2014 he got his first win in the 20th and final race of the ARCA season, the ARCA 98.9 at Kansas Speedway. Gallagher started 32nd, and led the final 32 laps of the race. Later that month, he earned a Truck Series best finish of third at Talladega on a last lap charge through the field.

NASCAR

2015
Gallagher went full-time in GMS Racing's 23 truck for 2015. Gallagher earned a second-place finish at Gateway Motorsports Park in June.

2016
Gallagher started the season with a low note crashing early at Daytona and recovered for a 21st-place finish. Starting at Phoenix, Gallagher ran a limited Xfinity Series schedule using the No. 21, scoring his first top 10 at Daytona. In the Truck Series he scored five straight top ten finishes until Texas. On June 25, 2016 at Gateway Motorsports Park, Gallagher was involved in a crash with John Wes Townley on lap 155 which led to an awkward fight between the two drivers for several seconds before NASCAR officials separated them. He was fined $12,000 and placed on probation at the end of the year. Gallagher finished 2nd at Talladega behind teammate Grant Enfinger.

2017

Gallagher moved up to the Xfinity Series full-time in 2017 with GMS, driving the No. 23 Chevy. During practice for the OneMain Financial 200 at Dover International Speedway, Gallagher spun Joey Gase going into turn three after Gase slowed down. Gase, running for single-car team Means Racing, blasted Gallagher in an interview with Fox Sports 1 afterwards, claiming that Gallagher "really, really sucks" for only being one spot ahead of Gase in the standings despite running for a top-tier team. This came after Gallagher told Gase to "get the hell away" in their conversation after the incident.

2018
In April, Gallagher scored his first career Xfinity win at Talladega; he passed leader Tyler Reddick on the final lap in overtime to record the victory. Four days later, however, he was indefinitely suspended by NASCAR for violating its substance abuse policy. Due to the suspension, Gallagher lost his Dash 4 Cash spot for the next race to Ryan Sieg and lost his playoff eligibility as well. His suspension ended and he was back in the No. 23 car at Kentucky.

In August, Gallagher joined BK Racing for his Monster Energy NASCAR Cup Series debut at Watkins Glen International. After starting 34th, he finished 35th.

Gallagher was originally supposed to replace Dalton Sargeant at Mosport due to his release, but aggravated his shoulder in a workout session a few days prior and Timothy Peters drove the No. 25 truck instead. While Peters continued piloting the truck for the next few races, Gallagher stepped in for Cody Coughlin at the Talladega Race in the No. 2 truck because of his release. He got caught up in the big one in the middle of the race and finished 25th.
On October 19, 2018 it was announced that Gallagher will be stepping away from NASCAR competition to be focusing on managing his father's racing organization in efforts to bring exploring new opportunities off the track.

Motorsports career results

NASCAR
(key) (Bold – Pole position awarded by qualifying time. Italics – Pole position earned by points standings or practice time. * – Most laps led.)

Monster Energy Cup Series

Xfinity Series

Camping World Truck Series

K&N Pro Series East

K&N Pro Series West

Canadian Tire Series

 Season still in progress
 Ineligible for series points

ARCA Racing Series
(key) (Bold – Pole position awarded by qualifying time. Italics – Pole position earned by points standings or practice time. * – Most laps led.)

See also
 GMS Racing

References

External links

 

Sportspeople from the Las Vegas Valley
Living people
1989 births
Racing drivers from Las Vegas
Racing drivers from Nevada
NASCAR drivers